The Neptune Society, Inc. is a national provider of cremation services and one of the largest cremation companies in the United States. Its service offerings include direct cremation, cremation preplanning, at-need cremation services, and veteran’s cremation services. Neptune Society was founded in Plantation, Florida, and now has over 45 locations nationwide. It is primarily known for its two nationally recognized final resting places: the Neptune Society Columbarium in San Francisco, California, and the Neptune Memorial Reef near Key Biscayne, Florida.

History 
The Neptune Society was established in 1973 and was incorporated in 1985. The company has assisted families with cremation planning for over 40 years. 

In 1999, the Neptune Society announced its completion of equity financing of $7 million with Standard Securities Capital Corp. in Toronto and appointed Marco Markin as president and chief executive. In 2000, the company announced it had acquired the Cremation Society of Iowa and registered with the Securities and Exchange Commission to be listed on the Nasdaq Stock Exchange. In 2003, it was reported that an $11.5 million deal proposed by the firm of Walt Disney’s great-nephew to buy Neptune Society was called off.

In June 2011, Service Corporation International announced it had purchased control by buying a 70 percent share of the company. It that time, the company's annual revenues were more than $55 million and it had more than $125 million in future revenue on its books.

Neptune Memorial Reef 

Neptune's burial at sea involves mixing cremated remains into concrete for a sturdy and secure final resting place. Spanning 16 acres, the memorial is one of the largest man-made reefs in the world. The US Environmental Protection Agency and a number of other national organizations approved construction on the reef according to predetermined guidelines and regulations. The reef is a popular destination for divers, tourists, and families depositing or visiting their family members' cremains.

Neptune Society Columbarium 

The Neptune Society Columbarium  of San Francisco is an architectural landmark in San Francisco and is the city's only nondenominational public burial space. The columbarium was built in 1898 by architect Bernard J.S. Cahill and is currently operated and maintained by the Neptune Society of Northern California. The copper-domed, Neo-Classical structure houses more than 8,500 niches for cremation urns. The building was designated as a San Francisco city landmark in 1996.

Controversies 
There have been controversies surrounding the Neptune Society brand over the years. In the late 1990s, the company settled lawsuits from the widow of a former Burbank mayor and 308 Southern California residents who claimed their loved ones’ remains were mishandled.

In November 2013, residents of East Oakland and members of Communities for a Better Environment (CBE) gathered around the Neptune Society office on Grand Avenue to protest the planned construction of a new crematory that would accommodate 3,000 deceased individuals. Opposition was primarily driven by environmental concerns. Arguments in favor of the facility pointed to job creation and other possible benefits of the crematory.

References

External links

Cremation
American companies established in 1973